Ngapala is a rural locality in the Mid North region of South Australia, situated in the Regional Council of Goyder. It was established in August 2000, when boundaries were formalised for the "long established local name". It is divided between the cadastral Hundreds of English and Julia Creek.

The area was originally the territory of the Ngadjuri people.

A school at Ngapala opened in 1908 as Anlaby Public School, having been built on land from the subdivision of part of Anlaby Station. It was subsequently renamed Ngapala Public School, and closed in 1938. The school building survives today and is privately owned. A postal receiving office opened at Ngapala on 3 January 1913. A post office was reported to have reopened in March 1923, and was closed permanently from 30 September 1967. Ngapala Methodist Church was built in 1924 and closed in 1984. The building survives and is privately owned.

Ngapala Cricket Club operated from the 1930s until its amalgamation with the Marrabel club in 1975–76, playing in the County of Eyre Association for most of its existence. Ngapala Tennis Club commenced around 1910, fell into inactivity around 1931, and was wound up around 1935.

A newspaper report in 1933 described Ngapala as consisting of "a Methodist church, school, and a post-office in a farm house", and stated that "mixed farming is the general occupation of this district.

References

Towns in South Australia
Mid North (South Australia)